The City Championship is an American men's college basketball rivalry game between the Aztecs of San Diego State University and Toreros of the University of San Diego. The winner of the game becomes City Champions.

Background
Founded in 1897, San Diego State University (SDSU) is a public research university in the California State University system. The San Diego State Aztecs men's basketball team is a member of the Mountain West Conference. The University of San Diego (USD), founded in 1949, is a private, Roman Catholic university, whose Toreros men's basketball team is a member of the West Coast Conference.

History
The first game between SDSU and USD was in the 1962–63 college basketball season. SDSU won 68-49 at home in Peterson Gym. USD's first win in the series was on January 22, 1965, an 89-85 victory at Peterson Gym.

The series has been played most recently annually since the 1998–99 season, on a home-and-home basis alternating between the SDSU Cox Arena (now Viejas Arena) in seasons beginning with even years and the USD Sports Center (now Jenny Craig Pavilion) in seasons beginning with odd years. By the 2014–15 season, SDSU had won 9 consecutive games in the series, the longest win streak in the series.

The 2015 matchup took place on neutral ground at Petco Park, home of the San Diego Padres, as part of the first ever Bill Walton Basketball Festival. The City Championship game was played on December 6, 2015 after a week of events including high school contests, corporate play, and physical education classes. The hardwood court was placed between home plate and third base, additional seating was added on the north and east sides of the court. The Toreros had a strong first half, outscoring the Aztecs 31-13. In the second half, the Aztecs came back strong, but the Toreros were able to hold on for a final 53-48 score.

Results

San Diego State victories are shaded in ██
San Diego  victories shaded in ██.
Numbers with (#) indicate a team's Associated Press Top 25 rank at the time of the games.

References

College basketball rivalries in the United States
San Diego State Aztecs men's basketball
San Diego Toreros men's basketball